Owen Price may refer to:

 Owen Price (footballer) (born 1986), English footballer
 Owen Price (writer), Welsh writer